The 2019–20 season was FC Viktoria Plzeň's 27th season in the Czech First League. The team competed in the Czech First League, the Czech Cup, and the UEFA Champions League.

First team squad
.

Transfers

In

Out

Loan in

Pre-season and friendlies

Competitions

Czech First League

Regular season

League table

Results summary

Results by round

Matches

Championship group

League table

Results summary

Results by round

Matches

Czech Cup

UEFA Champions League

Qualifying rounds

Second qualifying round

UEFA Europa League

Qualifying rounds

Third qualifying round

Squad statistics

Appearances and goals

References

External links
Official website

Viktoria Plzeň
FC Viktoria Plzeň seasons
Viktoria Plzeň